Alder Creek in Folsom, California, drains into Lake Natoma.

See also
List of rivers of California

References

American River (California)